Richard White (born 1947) is an American historian, two-time winner of the Francis Parkman Prize, past President of the Organization of American Historians, and the author of books about the American West, Native American history, the United States in the Gilded Age, railroads, capitalism, and environmental history. He is the Margaret Byrne Professor of American History Emeritus at Stanford University. Earlier in his career, he taught at the University of Washington, University of Utah, and Michigan State University.

He received his bachelor's degree from the University of California, Santa Cruz, and his M.A. and Ph.D. from the University of Washington.

White was founding director of Stanford's Spatial History Project, which implements digital technologies and analyses to illuminate patterns and anomalies for research purposes.

He was chosen for the MacArthur Fellows Program in 1995, and was elected a Member of the American Philosophical Society in 2016.

Works
Land Use, Environment, and Social Change: The Shaping of Island County, Washington. University of Washington Press, 1979.  (hardback);  (1992 paperback).
The Roots of Dependency: Subsistence, Environment, and Social Change Among the Choctaws, Pawnees, and Navajos. University of Nebraska Press, 1983. ;  (1988 paperback).
The Middle Ground: Indians, Empires, and Republics in the Great Lakes Region, 1650-1815. Cambridge University Press, 1991.  (hardback);  (paperback).
"It's Your Misfortune and None of my Own": A History of the American West. Norman: University of Oklahoma Press, 1991. .
The Frontier in American Culture: An Exhibition at the Newberry Library, August 26, 1994-January 7, 1995, with Patricia Nelson Limerick, edited by James Grossman. University of California, 1994. ;  (paperback).
The Organic Machine: The Remaking of the Columbia River. New York: Hill and Wang, 1996. .
Remembering Ahanagran: A History of Stories. New York: Hill and Wang, 1998. .
"Corporations, Corruption, and the Modern Lobby: A Gilded Age Story of the West and the South in Washington, D.C.", Southern Spaces, 16 April 2009. online
Railroaded: The Transcontinentals and the Making of Modern America. New York: W. W. Norton & Company, 2011.  (cloth).
 The Republic for Which It Stands: The United States during Reconstruction and the Gilded Age, 1865-1896 (Oxford History of the United States, 2017).
 California Exposures: Envisioning Myth and History, with photographs by Jesse Amble White. New York: W. W. Norton & Company, 2020.  (cloth).
 Who Killed Jane Stanford: A Gilded Age Tale of Murder, Deceit, Spirits and the Birth of a University W. W. Norton & Company, 2022.

Awards and honors
Francis Parkman Prize for best book on American history (The Middle Ground), 1992
Albert J. Beveridge Award for best English-language book on American history (The Middle Ground), 1992
Albert B. Corey Prize for best book on U.S.-Canadian history (The Middle Ground), 1992
James A. Rawley Prize for book on history of race relations in the United States (The Middle Ground), 1992
Pulitzer Prize Nominated Finalist The Middle Ground, 1992, and Railroaded: The Transcontinentals and the Making of Modern America, 2011
Western Heritage Award for "It's Your Misfortune and None of My Own", 1992
MacArthur Foundation fellowship, 1995
Los Angeles Times Book Prize (History), Railroaded: The Transcontinentals and the Making of Modern America, 2011

Notes

External links
"Bibliography of historian Richard White"

1947 births
Living people
21st-century American historians
21st-century American male writers
Environmental historians
Historians of the United States
Historians of race relations
University of California, Santa Cruz alumni
University of Washington alumni
University of Washington faculty
University of Utah faculty
Michigan State University faculty
Stanford University Department of History faculty
MacArthur Fellows
Historians of the American West
Members of the American Philosophical Society
American male non-fiction writers